The Confederación Española de Derechas Autónomas (CEDA), was a Spanish political party in the Second Spanish Republic. A Catholic conservative force, it was the political heir to Ángel Herrera Oria's Acción Popular and defined itself in terms of the 'affirmation and defence of the principles of Christian civilization,' translating this theoretical stand into a practical demand for the revision of the republican constitution.  The CEDA saw itself as a defensive organisation, formed to protect religion, family, and property. José María Gil-Robles declared his intention to "give Spain a true unity, a new spirit, a totalitarian polity..." and went on to say "Democracy is not an end but a mean to achieve the conquest of the new state. When the time comes, either parliament submits or we will eliminate it." The CEDA held fascist-style rallies, called Gil-Robles "Jefe", the equivalent of Duce, and claimed that the CEDA might lead a "March on Madrid" (similar to the Italian Fascist March on Rome) to forcefully seize power.

The CEDA claimed that it was defending Spain and "Christian civilization" from Marxism, and claimed that the political atmosphere in Spain had made politics a matter of Marxism versus anti-Marxism. With the advent of the rise of the Nazi Party to power in Germany, the CEDA aligned itself with similar propaganda ploys to the Nazis, including the Nazi emphasis on authority, the fatherland, and hierarchy. Gil-Robles attended an audience at the Nazi Party rally in Nuremberg and was influenced by it, henceforth becoming committed to creating a single anti-Marxist counterrevolutionary front in Spain.

CEDA was largely the party of the Catholic middle-class and Northern Spanish smallholders. It would ultimately be the most popular individual party in Spain in the 1936 elections.

The CEDA failed to make the substantive electoral gains from 1933 to 1936 (though it did see an increase in the number of individual votes) that were needed for it to form government which resulted in right-wing support draining from it and turning towards the belligerent Alfonsist monarchist leader José Calvo Sotelo. Subsequently, the CEDA abandoned its moderation and legalism and began providing support for those committed to violence against the republic, including handing over its electoral funds to the initial leader of the military coup against the republic, General Emilio Mola. Subsequently, many of the supporters of the CEDA's youth movement, Juventudes de Acción Popular (JAP; "Youth for Popular Action") began to defect en masse to join the Falange Española de las Juntas de Ofensiva Nacional Sindicalista or "Falange".

The CEDA eclipses the republican centre
Gil Robles set up CEDA to contest the 1933 election, and tacitly embraced Fascism. Despite dismissing the idea of a party as a 'rigid fiction', the CEDA leaders created a stable party organisation which would lead the Spanish right into the age of mass politics. The CEDA was constructed around organisational units known as Derechas Autónomas, the first of which had been established in Salamanca in December 1932. Having accepted the "principles of Christian civilization", confederated bodies retained full freedom both of thought and of action – such a definition was framed with the Carlists in mind.  The right would work together for 'the radical transformation of the regime.' October 1933 announcement of a snap general election in November brought about an unprecedented mobilization of the Spanish right. El Debate instructed its readers to make the coming elections into an "obsession", the " sublime culmination of citizenly duties," so that victory in the polls would bring an end to the republican bienio rojo. Great emphasis was placed on the techniques of electoral propaganda. Gil Robles visited Nazi Germany to study modern methods, including the Nuremberg Rally.  A national electoral committee was established, comprising CEDA, Alfonsist, Traditionalist, and Agrarian representatives – but excluding Miguel Maura's Conservative Republicans. The CEDA swamped entire localities with electoral publicity. The party produced ten million leaflets, together with some two hundred thousand coloured posters and hundreds of cars were used to distribute this material through the provinces. In all of the major cities propaganda films were shown around the streets on screens mounted on large lorries.

The polarization of political opinions and the CEDA
The need for unity was the constant theme of the campaign fought by the CEDA and the election was presented as a confrontation of ideas, not of personalities. The electors' choice was simple: they voted for redemption or revolution and they voted for Christianity or Communism.  The fortunes of Republican Spain, according to one of its posters had been decided by 'immorality and anarchy'.  Catholics who continued to proclaim their republicanism were moved into the revolutionary camp and many speeches argued that the Catholic republican option had become totally illegitimate. 'A good Catholic may not vote for the Conservative Republican party' declared a Gaceta Regional editorial and the impression was given that Conservative Republicans, far from being Catholics, were in fact anti-religious.  In this all-round attack on the political centre, the mobilization of women also became a major electoral tactic of the Catholic right.  The Asociación Femenina de Educación had been formed in October 1931. As the 1933 general election approached women were warned that unless they voted correctly communism would come " which will tear your children from your arms, your parish church will be destroyed, the husband you love will flee from your side authorized by the divorce law, anarchy will come to the countryside, hunger and misery to your home."  AFEC orators and organisers urged women to vote 'For God and for Spain!' Mirroring the female qualities emphasized by AFEC the CEDA's self-styled sección de defensa brought young male activists to the fore.  In one incident in the last week of the campaign, in Guijuelo the efforts of a group of left wing sympathisers to prevent people entering the bullring, where José María Lamamié de Clairac was speaking,  led to a running battle with CEDA's sección de defensa.  Later stopped and searched they were found to be carrying a quantity of pizzle whips – (bullwhips made from the dried penises of bulls) – taken along to 'fend off the violence which had been promised.' It was one example of the polarisation of political opinions which had occurred in the province of Salamanca, Robles's province, since the early days of the Republic. This new CEDA squad was also very much in evidence on election day itself, when its members patrolled the streets and polling stations in the provincial capital, supposedly to prevent the left from tampering with the ballot boxes.

In the 1933 elections, the CEDA won the most seats in the Cortes in no small part because the massive CNT membership abstained, holding true to their anarchist principles. The CEDA had won a plurality of seats; however, these were not enough to form a majority, but then President Niceto Alcalá-Zamora declined to invite the leader of the CEDA, Gil Robles, to form a government and instead invited the Radical Republican Party's Alejandro Lerroux to do so. CEDA supported the centrist government led by Lerroux; it later demanded and, on October 1, 1934, received three ministerial positions. They suspended most of the reforms of the previous Manuel Azaña government, provoking an armed miners' rebellion in Asturias on October 6, and an independentist rebellion in Catalonia—both rebellions were suppressed (the Asturias rebellion by young General Francisco Franco), being followed by mass political arrests and trials.  CEDA continued to mimic the German Nazi Party, Robles staging a rally in March 1934, to shouts of "Jefe" ("Chief", after the Italian "Duce" used in support of Mussolini). Robles used anti-strike law to pick union leaders off one by one, and attempted to undermine the republican government of the Republican Left of Catalonia, who attempted to continue the republic's previous reforms. Using the title jefe, the JAP created an intense and often disturbing cult around the figure of Gil Robles. Robles himself had returned from Nuremberg Rally in 1933 and spoken of its " youthful enthusiasm, steeped in optimism, so different to the desolate and enervating scepticism of our defeatists and intellectuals."

Stanley Payne argues that CEDA was neither fascist nor democratic. Payne argues that CEDA's goal was to win power through legal means and to then enact a constitutional revision that would protect property and religion and alter the basic political system. They would create neither a fascist state nor an absolute monarchy but a Catholic, corporative republic. While this would entail the limitation of direct democratic rights, it would not be a state in the style of Hitler or Mussolini's but probably closer to the neighbouring Portuguese Estado Novo.

The Juventudes de Acción Popular, the youth wing within the CEDA, "soon developed its own character. The JAP emphasized sporting and political activity. It had its own fortnightly paper, the first issue of which proclaimed: 'We want a new state.' The JAP's distaste for the principles of universal suffrage was such that internal decisions were never voted upon. As the thirteenth point of the JAP put it: "Anti-parliamentarianism. Anti-dictatorship. The people participating in Government in an organic manner, not by degenerate democracy." The line between Christian corporatism and fascist statism became very thin indeed. The fascist tendencies of the JAP were vividly demonstrated in the series of rallies held by the CEDA youth movement during the course of 1934.

On 26 September, the CEDA announced it would no longer support the RRP's minority government; it was replaced by a RRP cabinet, led by Lerroux once more, that included three members of the CEDA.

Rifts, moving further to the right

Between November 1934 and March 1935, the CEDA minister for agriculture, Manuel Giménez Fernández, introduced into parliament a series of agrarian reform measures designed to better conditions in the Spanish countryside. These moderate proposals met with a hostile response from reactionary elements within the Cortes, including the conservative wing of the CEDA and the proposed reform was defeated. A change of personnel in the ministry also followed. The agrarian reform bill proved to be a catalyst for a series of increasingly bitter divisions within the Catholic right, rifts that indicated that the broad based CEDA alliance was disintegrating. Partly as a result of the impetus of the JAP, the Catholic party had been moving further to the right, forcing the resignation of moderate government figures, including Filiberto Villalobos. Gil-Robles was not prepared to return the agriculture portfolio to Giménez Fernández. "For all the social Catholic rhetoric, the extreme right had won the day."

Lerroux's Radical government collapsed after two large scandals, including the Straperlo affair. However, Zamora did not allow the CEDA to form a government, and called elections. The elections of February 16, 1936 were narrowly won by the Popular Front, with vastly smaller resources than the political right, who followed Nazi propaganda techniques.  CEDA turned its campaign chest over to army plotter Emilio Mola.  Monarchist José Calvo Sotelo replaced Gil Robles as the right's leading spokesman in parliament. The Falange expanded massively, and thousands of the JAP joined the organisation (though the majority of the JAP seem to have abandoned politics).  They successfully created a sense of militancy on the streets, in order to make an authoritarian regime justifiable. CEDA came under direct attack from the Falange. This rapid radicalization of the CEDA youth movement effectively meant that all attempts to save parliamentary Catholicism were doomed to failure.

Many of the party's supporters welcomed the military rebellion in the summer of 1936 which led to the Spanish Civil War. In April 1937, the rebel leader Francisco Franco issued the Unification Decree which laid out the creation of the FET y de las JONS upon the merging of the Fascist FE de las JONS and the traditionalist carlists, outlawing the rest of political parties in the rebel-controlled territory. As result, CEDA ceased to exist. Many party cadres, including Franco's co-brother-in-law Ramón Serrano Suñer (who ended up becoming chief of the political junta of the FET y de las JONS) joined the new organization.

See also
:Category:CEDA politicians

References

Sources

Preston, Paul. Franco and Azaña , Volume: 49 Issue: 5, May 1999

1933 establishments in Spain
1937 disestablishments in Spain
Anti-communism in Spain
Anti-communist parties
Catholic political parties
Conservative parties in Spain
Defunct Christian political parties
Defunct conservative parties
Defunct nationalist parties in Spain
Defunct political party alliances in Spain
National conservative parties
Political parties disestablished in 1937
Political parties established in 1933
Political parties of the Spanish Civil War
Second Spanish Republic